Liquid Kids is a 1990 platform arcade video game  developed and published by Taito. Starring the hippopotamus Hipopo, players travel through the land of Woody-Lake throwing water bombs, jumping on and off platforms to navigate level obstacles while dodging and defeating monsters in order to rescue Tamasun from her captor, the Fire Demon. The game was  ported to the PC Engine and Sega Saturn. Home computer versions were in development but none were officially released to the public.

Liquid Kids enjoyed success in arcades among players, garnering positive reception from critics, while its home conversions were also met with similarly positive response from gaming magazines who reviewed it as an import title.

Gameplay 

Liquid Kids is a platform game where players assume the role of Hipopo, a platypus (erroneously called a hippopotamus in English versions) who fights his way across various stages set in the land of Woody-Lake against enemies led by Fire Demon in search of his missing girlfriend Tamasun while rescuing other hippos along the way. Hipopo is armed with water bombs that can be thrown at enemies to soak and damage them. Once soaked, enemies can be kicked and destroyed completely. Undefeated enemies will dry out and recover after a short time period. Small plants also appear on certain levels which can be "watered", causing them to grow and creating new platforms. He can also collect cakes and other items to gain more points. Getting hit by enemies results in losing a life, as well as a penalty of lowering Hipopo's status to his original state. There is also an invisible time limit. If the player takes too long to complete the stage, a jingle will play along with "Hurry Up!" music and the screen will get dimmer, along with the little demon from the Hipopo and Tamasun cutscenes chasing the player until he catches them. The game is over once all lives are lost, unless players insert more credits into the arcade machine to continue playing.

Release 
Liquid Kids was first released in arcades by Taito in August 1990, using the Taito F2 System board. The soundtrack was composed by Kazuko "Karu" Umino. On January 21, 1991, an album containing music from the game and Space Gun was co-published exclusively in Japan by Scitron and Pony Canyon. The title was first ported to the PC Engine by Taito and released exclusively in Japan on January 17, 1992. It is a faithful conversion that retains most of the gameplay elements from the arcade original but a number of graphical effects were removed such as the time transitions and parallax scrolling. This version would later be re-released for the Wii's Virtual Console in 2008. A near-arcade perfect port was developed and published by Ving for the Sega Saturn on October 22, 1998. It was also included in the Taito Legends 2 (Taito Memories 2 in Japan) for Xbox, PlayStation 2 and Microsoft Windows in 2006. The original arcade version is planned to be included as part of the Taito Egret II mini console. An Amiga port was completed by Ocean France, but not released by Ocean Software. Likewise, an Atari ST version was also in development but never released by Ocean. Liquid Kids was released on Nintendo Switch and PlayStation 4 as part of the Arcade Archives series on December 2, 2021.

Reception 

In Japan, Game Machine listed Liquid Kids on their November 15, 1990 issue as being the seventeenth most-successful table arcade unit of the month, outperforming titles such as Parodius! From Myth to Laughter and Magic Sword. The arcade original was also met with positive reception from critics since its initial release. The PC Engine conversion was met with positive reception from critics.

Legacy 
Hipopo makes cameo appearances in Arkanoid vs. Space Invaders.

Notes

References

External links 
 Liquid Kids at GameFAQs
 Liquid Kids at Giant Bomb
 Liquid Kids at Killer List of Videogames
 Liquid Kids at MobyGames

1990 video games
Arcade video games
Cancelled Amiga games
Cancelled Atari ST games
Nintendo Switch games
Platform games
PlayStation 4 games
Sega Saturn games
Taito arcade games
TurboGrafx-16 games
Virtual Console games
Video games developed in Japan
Multiplayer and single-player video games
Hamster Corporation games